Aleksandr Sergeyevich Grebnev (born 7 May 1947) is a Russian former professional footballer. He made his professional debut in the Soviet Top League in 1966 for FC Spartak Moscow.

Honours
 Soviet Top League champion: 1969.
 Soviet Top League runner-up: 1968.
 European Cup Winners' Cup 1971–72 finalist (2 games).

References

1947 births
Living people
Russian footballers
Soviet footballers
Association football midfielders
Soviet Top League players
FC Spartak Moscow players
FC Dinamo Minsk players
FC Dynamo Moscow players
FC Torpedo Moscow players
FC Irtysh Pavlodar players